"I Saw You Dancing" is a song by Swedish group Yaki-Da. It was released in 1994, as the lead single from their first studio album, Pride (1995), and is written and produced by Jonas Berggren from Ace of Base. The song was a top 10 hit in Denmark, Finland, Iceland, Israel, Malaysia, Norway and on the Canadian RPM Dance/Urban chart.

Critical reception
The song received favorable reviews from most music critics. John Bush from AllMusic said the group "pursue the same bubblegum dance-pop route" as Ace of Base on the song. Larry Flick from Billboard called it "a sunny li'l confection". He wrote that the "chirpy Swedish female duo makes an excellent first impression with a bright and shuffling pop confection that proudly wears the fingerprints of mentor Jonas Berggren from Ace of Base. The track wins with a simple but memorable melody that blossoms into a swirling, thickly harmonious chorus..." Dave Sholin from the Gavin Report commented that "it's easy to get hooked on this plaintive melody line. One hundred percent pure pop is exactly what one would expect from Ace of Base's Jonas "Joker" Berggren, who produced this song. It's easy to hear that mission has been accomplished." Pan-European magazine Music & Media noted, "Bookers, here's the one to put all your money on. Penned by Ace Of Base's Joker, it is in the famed pop reggae mould with a touch of ABBA and other past Eurovision winners." Chuck Campbell from Scripps Howard News Service noted it as a "very ABBA-like single". James Hunter from Vibe described it as "latinesque pop disco".

Chart performance
"I Saw You Dancing" was very successful on the charts in several continents and remains the group's biggest hit to date. It peaked within the top 10 in Denmark, Finland, Iceland, Israel, Malaysia and Norway. In Greece, it hit number-one on the Radio Star FM. In their homecountry Sweden, "I Saw You Dancing" reached number 32 and on the Eurochart Hot 100, it went to number 97. In the US, the single managed to reach number 54 on the Billboard Hot 100, number 11 on the Billboard Hot Dance Club Play chart and number 41 on the Cash Box Top 100 Pop Singles chart. In Canada, the song climbed to number 10 on the RPM Dance/Urban chart and number 62 on the RPM Top Singles chart.

Music video
Right at the beginning of the music video, a male dancer walks along the beach. He finds a medallion with the letter "y" engraved on it. As the music starts, two women, Linda and Marie, in black dresses are walking ashore by a lighthouse. On the beach, a group of circus artists and musicians are having a party. The dancer is there, dancing with the medallion on his chest. Other scenes show the two women singing at the top of the lighthouse. Sometimes they are also standing out in the water, wearing glittery dresses. The man with the medallion are seen going into the tent of a fortune teller. He puts the medallion on the table to her and she traces him with tarot cards. Then she looks at him with an astonished mine. Linda and Marie stays the night, standing in the dark, illuminated only by the fire from the beach party. They watch the party and the people there from a distance. As it dawns, the women return to the sea. The male dancer stands and watches them walk into the sea. They look back at him, as he hesitantly steps forward. The video was uploaded to YouTube in December 2011. As of August 2020, it has got more than 28,4 million views.

Covers
In 1995, Roberts Gobziņš made a nonsensical phonetical cover titled "Man saujā benzīns".

Track listing

 12" single, Scandinavia (1994)
"I Saw You Dancing" (Tribal Radiocut) — 4:39
"I Saw You Dancing" (House Radiocut) — 5:09
"I Saw You Dancing" (Tribal Anthem) — 9:11
"I Saw You Dancing" (Radio) — 3:41

 12" single, US (1995)
"I Saw You Dancing" (Lenny B's Classic House Mix) — 7:31
"I Saw You Dancing" (Lenny B's Classic House Mix Instrumental) — 7:31
"I Saw You Dancing" (Armand's Serial Killa Mix) — 8:43
"I Saw You Dancing" (Lenny B's Classic Edit) — 4:08

 CD single, Scandinavia (1994)
"I Saw You Dancing" (Radio) — 3:41
"I Saw You Dancing" (Extended) — 4:49

 CD single, US (1995)
"I Saw You Dancing" (Album Version) — 3:44
"I Saw You Dancing" (Lenny B's Classic Edit) — 4:08
"I Saw You Dancing" (Armand's Serial Killa Mix) — 8:43
"I Saw You Dancing" (Lenny B's Classic House Mix) — 7:31
"I Saw You Dancing" (Original Mix) — 3:41
"Rescue Me Tonight" (Album Version) — 4:12

 CD maxi, Japan (1995)
"I Saw You Dancing" (Radio) — 3:41
"I Saw You Dancing" (Extended) — 4:49
"I Saw You Dancing" (East Mix) — 3:41
"I Saw You Dancing" (Tribal Radiocut)	 — 4:39
"I Saw You Dancing" (House Radiocut) — 5:09

Credits
Written-By – Jonas "Joker" Berggren
Vocals – Linda Schonberg & Marie Knutsen  
Recorded and Mixed-By – John Ballard & Joker in Tuff Studios, Gothenburg
Guitars – Kenneth Svensson
Choir – John B
℗ 1994 Metronome Musik GmbH
© 1994 Mega Records

Charts

Weekly charts

Year-end charts

References

1994 singles
1994 songs
Songs about dancing
Yaki-Da songs
Songs written by Jonas Berggren
Mega Records singles
English-language Swedish songs